The 2004 ATP Buenos Aires was a men's tennis tournament played on outdoor clay courts at the Buenos Aires Lawn Tennis Club in Buenos Aires, Argentina and was part of the International Series of the 2004 ATP Tour. It was the 32nd edition of the tournament and was held from 16 February through 22 February 2004. First-seeded Guillermo Coria won the singles title.

Finals

Singles

 Guillermo Coria defeated  Carlos Moyá 6–4, 6–1
 It was Coria's 1st title of the year and the 7th of his career.

Doubles

 Lucas Arnold /  Mariano Hood defeated  Federico Browne /  Diego Veronelli 7–5, 6–7(2–7), 6–4
 It was Arnold's 1st title of the year and the 12th of his career. It was Hood's 1st title of the year and the 9th of his career.

References

External links
Official website
ATP tournament profile
Singles draw
Doubles draw

ATP Buenos Aires
ATP Buenos Aires
ATP Buenos Aires
February 2004 sports events in South America